Khaled's Ya-Rayi (meaning My opinion) studio album was released in Europe in August 2004 by AZ Records, a label of Universal Music France, and later licensed in UK, and then reissued in United States on June 27, 2005. The European release was dubbed a "back to the roots" album, while the United States release was dubbed a "peace through music" album.

The album includes remakes of El Hadj M'Hamed El Anka's "El-H'mam" and Rabah Driassa and Blaoui Houari's "H'mama".

Track listing
"Mani Hani"
"Ya-Rayi"
"Zine Zina"
"El-H'mam"
"Lemen"
"Ya Galbi"
"H'mama"
"Ensa El Hem"
"Hagda"
"El Ghira"
"El-H'mam" (Imhotep Remix)

In the UK the Universal Music France album was licensed unchanged to Wrasse Records with the French album track listing and an extra DVD of music clips. The Wrasse Records release (Wrasse 127X) included the original French booklet with Arabic sung texts in French romanization and studio notes in French, but with a CD backing tray insert in English.

References

External links
 Ya-Rayi on Shawshara.com, Ya-Rayi's lyrics and English lyrics translation

2004 albums
2005 albums
Khaled (musician) albums
Albums produced by Don Was
Wrasse Records albums
Albums produced by Philippe Eidel